Jahial "John" Parmly Paret (October 3, 1870 – November 24, 1952) was a tennis player and writer from the United States.

Paret won the All-Comers final, but finished runner-up to Malcolm Whitman in the Challenge Round of the U.S. National Championships men's singles event, in 1899. He also reached the quarterfinals in 1897. Parmly Paret became the author or several books about tennis technique and strategy, including Lawn Tennis : its Past, Present, and Future (1904), Methods and Players of Modern Lawn Tennis (1915) and Mechanics of the Game of Lawn Tennis (1926).

Grand Slam finals

Singles (1 runner-up)

References

External links
 

19th-century American people
19th-century male tennis players
American male tennis players
1870 births
1952 deaths
Tennis writers
Tennis people from New Jersey